Marine Corps Supply Activity, also known as Quartermaster's Depot, U.S. Marine Corps, is a historic office building and warehouse located in the Point Breeze neighborhood of South Philadelphia in Philadelphia, Pennsylvania. It was built by the Marine Corps in two sections in 1904 and in 1908. The building is a five-story, red brick, stone, and concrete building in the Classical Revival-style. It features pilasters with Ionic order capitals.

During World War II, the build served as headquarters of Depot of Supplies under Brigadier General Maurice C. Gregory and was responsible for the production of military hardware and housekeeping supplies included hat ornaments, mosquito nets, mess pans, helmets, articles of uniforms, foot lockers, buckets, stoves, tent poles, bunks, etc.

The building was added to the National Register of Historic Places in 1975.  As of 2010, it had been converted to residential condominiums under the name "Marine Club".

References
Notes

External links

Military facilities on the National Register of Historic Places in Philadelphia
Neoclassical architecture in Pennsylvania
Government buildings completed in 1908
South Philadelphia
1908 establishments in Pennsylvania